Petar Tonchev (born 8 April 1989) is a Bulgarian footballer who plays as a winger for Pershore Town.

Career
On 7 July 2017, Tonchev signed with Oborishte.

In June 2018, he joined Second League club Tsarsko Selo but a few weeks later agreed terms with Minyor Pernik.
In February 2020 he signed for FC Stratford. Chicken Farmer by trade, Petar went down the avenue of Plum Farming in November 2021 at Pershore Town.

References

External links
 
 

1989 births
Living people
Bulgarian footballers
First Professional Football League (Bulgaria) players
Second Professional Football League (Bulgaria) players
Gamma Ethniki players
FC Chavdar Etropole players
FC Bansko players
PFC Marek Dupnitsa players
OFC Pirin Blagoevgrad players
FC Septemvri Sofia players
FC Pirin Razlog players
FC Oborishte players
PFC Minyor Pernik players
PFC Dobrudzha Dobrich players
PFC Spartak Pleven players
Bulgarian expatriate footballers
Bulgarian expatriate sportspeople in Greece
Expatriate footballers in Greece
Association football wingers
Sportspeople from Pleven